Tachina trigonophora is a species of fly in the genus Tachina of the family Tachinidae that is endemic to North Korea.

References

Insects described in 1980
Diptera of Asia
Endemic fauna of North Korea
trigonophora